Tegi Pannu is a singer and songwriter who works predominantly in Punjabi music. He became known with his single "Into You" with Manni Sandhu. His various singles charted on the UK Asian Music Chart and the UK Punjabi Charts by Official Charts Company.

Career 

In 2021, Tegi pannu pursued his career with Manni Sandhu releasing his single 'Into You' followed by Fully Loaded and Schedule.

Singles discography

References

Punjabi-language singers
Living people
Indian Sikhs
Singers from Punjab, India
Punjabi-language lyricists
Year of birth missing (living people)